The 1994 Norwegian Football Cup was the 89th edition of the Norwegian Football Cup. The 1994 Norwegian Football Cup was won by Molde after they defeated Lyn in the final with the score 3–2. Both teams played in the 1. divisjon (Level 2) at the time.

Calendar
Below are the dates for each round as given by the official schedule:

First round

|colspan="3" style="background-color:#97DEFF"|3 May 1994

|-
|colspan="3" style="background-color:#97DEFF"|4 May 1994

|-
|colspan="3" style="background-color:#97DEFF"|5 May 1994

|}

Second round

|colspan="3" style="background-color:#97DEFF"|18 May 1994

|-
|colspan="3" style="background-color:#97DEFF"|19 May 1994

|}

Third round

|colspan="3" style="background-color:#97DEFF"|8 June 1994

|}

Fourth round

|colspan="3" style="background-color:#97DEFF"|20 July 1994

|}

Quarter-finals

Semi-finals

First leg

Second leg

Molde won 3–2 on aggregate.

Lyn won 3–2 on aggregate.

Final

References
http://www.rsssf.no

Norwegian Football Cup seasons
Norway
Football Cup